Calosoma subasperatus is a species of ground beetle in the subfamily of Carabinae. It was described by Schaeffer in 1915.

References

subasperatus
Beetles described in 1915